Werner Klotz, (* 1956 in Bonn, Germany) is an artist based in Berlin and New York, working in the fields of installation and interactive art.

Life and career 
Werner Klotz was born 1956 in Bonn, Germany. In 1974 he moved to West Berlin.

He worked first as a painter then as a sculptor and installation artist. His work relies on natural contexts.

In 1981 he cofounded the artist group Material&Wirkung e.V., Berlin (Material&Effect), they organized art projects in public context and early installation art till 1985.

In 1982 he began a complex body of work with live Roman Snails (Helix Pomatia L.) in conserving their trails in time, space and movement-based art works as well as performances and interventions.

In 1990 he moved to San Francisco. His work at this time included the development and fabrication of functional optical instruments and installations. These Perception Instruments are the foundation of this public art works leading to the present day.

His current artworks make use of site-specific and interactive contexts that rely on viewer participation to emphasize themes and ideas unique to each project. Using a variety of materials and strategies including light, sound, video and mechanics.

Realized projects include Le Milieu du Monde, a permanent multimedia installation onboard the Bridge deck of three new Staten Island Ferries in New York City and Anemone, an interactive kinetic installation permanently on view at the San Francisco International Airport.  Flying Sails, two kinetic light sculptures at Seattle's SeaTac airport's light rail station are activated by the air pressure of passing trains.

From 2014-18 he realized three large scale kinetic light art works for the new sculpture park Dosse Park in Wittstock, Germany.

In 2020 Werner Klotz created the 13 channel video sculpture Candelabro commemorating the Portuguese Diplomat Aristides de Sousa Mendes who saved more than 30,000 people from the Holocaust.

This artwork was commissioned by the New York Sousa Mendes Foundation.

In April 2021 Werner Klotz, in collaboration with artist Jim Campbell, installed the artwork Silent Stream for the Union Square Station of the Central Subway in San Francisco. Silent Stream  consists of more than 10,000 unique reflective discs of different sizes and is around one hundred and fifty meters long. This permanent artwork will be open to the public as of 2022.

Werner Klotz is the recipient of the New York City Art Commission award for excellence in Public Art and the Marler Medien Kunst Preis- Raum-Medien - Germany's most respected Media Art Award.

Beside his sculptural art works Werner Klotz created a two-dimensional body of work with printed digital files based on compositions of video imagery stills from water surfaces filmed in Californian waterfalls. Together with his daughter Nanette (* 2004 in Vancouver) he discovered and researched a section of a creek in the wilderness north of Vancouver, BC and is still working on photographic compositions of water, current, light and mineral structures directly in this stream.

Awards 

 2002  New York City Art Commission Award for Excellence in Design of Public Art
 2002  Marler Medienkunst-Preis, Raum–Medien, Museum Glaskasten, Marl
 1999  Arbeitsstipendium (working grant), Stiftung Kunstfonds, Bonn
 1998  Istanbul Stipendium, Senatsverwaltung für Kultur und Europa, Berlin
 1997  Artist in residence, Djerassi Resident Artist Program, Woodside, USA
 1996  Artist in residence, City Art Gallery Auckland, New Zealand
 1994  Berliner Künstlerstipendium (artist working grant), Senatsverwaltung für Kultur, Berlin

Public art commissions 

 2019-20   Candelabro - Aristides de Sousa Mendes, 13 channel Video/Audio sculpture commissioned by the Sousa Mendes Foundation, New York
 2019        Schlachtfeld( Battlefield), commissioned sculpture for Museum Dreissig Jaehriger Krieg, Wittstock, Germany
 2014–17  Mitte der Welt (Middle of the World), permanent kinetic outdoor sculpture, Sonnenfänger (Sun Catcher), light sculpture and Wolkenhaus (House of Clouds), Kunsthaus Dosse Park, Wittstock
 2010–21  Silent Stream, Union/Market Central Subway Station, San Francisco, with artist Jim Campbell, San Francisco Art Commission, Installation  April 2021
 2011        Spiegelkabinett (House of Mirrors), Kindermuseum, Berlin
 2006–09   Deutsche Telekom AG, Bonn, Commission and Prototypes for interactive bus stops, light sculptures and out of home furniture
 2005-10   Flying Sails, SEATAC Airport Light Rail Station, commissioned two kinetic light sculptures, Soundtransit Public Art Program, Seattle
 2004        Anemone, San Francisco International Airport, interactive kinetic sculpture, San Francisco Art Commission, SFO airport collection
 2002–06  Le Milieu du Monde, Staten Island Ferries, Commission for  a GPS steered Light-, Video- and Audio, Installation on all three bridge decks on each ferry, Department of Culture and Department of Transportation, New York City, USA
 2000        Spiegel/Spiegel (Mirror/Mirror),  Exhibition concept and optical instrument building, Kinder- und Jugendmuseum, Munich
 1999        Scala, Charité Universitätsklinikum, Berlin, permanent Installation historical Auditorium, Medizinhistorisches Museum, Berlin
 1999        Colloquium Externum, permanent kinetic out door sculpture, Fachhochschule für Wirtschaft, (University of Business), Ludwigshafen
 1997        Doorsph, Brenner Pass, out door sculpture, Italian/Austrian border

Public collections 

 Arp Museum Bahnhof Rolandseck, Landesmuseum Rheinland-Pfalz
 Berlinische Galerie, Landesmuseum Berlin
 Karl-Ernst Osthaus Museum, Hagen
 Kunstsammlung der Jenoptik, Jena
 Zentrum fuer Kunst und Medien, ZKM, Karlsruhe
 Museum-DreissigJaehriger Krieg, Wittstock, Germany
 Neuer-Berliner Kunstverein (NBK), Berlin
 Sammlung-Haupt, Berlin
 New-York City Art Commission, USA
 SFO-airport collection, San Francisco
 San-Francisco Art Commission, USA
 Sousa-Mendes Foundation, New York
 Targetti-Light Art Collection, Florence, Italy

Bibliography 

 Lopez, Mario Jorge, Publico Magazine, Portugal, Neste Candelabro brilha o exemplo de um homem justo, 4/26/2021
 Kornhoff, Oliver and Mattern, Jutta, Das Auge ist ein seltsames Tier, Arp Museum Bahnhof Rolandseck, solo catalogue, Salon Verlag 2017
 Kacunco, Slavco, Spiegel-Medium Kunst. Zur Geschichte des Spiegels im Zeitalter des Bildes
 Mirror. Medium. Art. On the history of mirror in the age of image, Wilhelm-Fink Verlag, Munich, Germany, 2010
 Kimmelmann, Michael, Risks and Reward in the Art in the Open, in New York Times, 8/19/2005
 Kacunco, Slavco, Closed Circuit Video Installations, catalogue essay, Logos Verlag, Germany, 2004
 Freitag, Michael and others, Werner Klotz-Exercise Room, solo catalogue, Galerie der Jenoptic, Jena, Germany, 2000
 Daniels, Dieter, German Media Art 1980-2000, catalogue essay, ZKM, Karlsruhe, Germany, 2000
 Kunde, Harald, and others, Material & Wirkung, solo exhibition-catalogue, Kunsthaus, Dresden, Dresden, Germany, 1998
 Barzel, Amnon, Targetti Light Art Collection, catalogue essay, Florence, Italy, 1998
 Block, René and Angelika Stepken, Medienkunst aus Berlin, catalogue essay, Berlin, 1997
 Happel, Reinhold and others, Werner Klotz, solo exhibition catalogue, Kunstverein Braunschweig, 1996
 Fehr, Michael, Werner Klotz – Perception Instruments, solo catalogue, Karl Ernst Osthaus Museum, 1996
 Daniels, Dieter, Minima Media, catalogue essay, Medienbiennale, Leipzig, Germany, 1994
 Schultz, Bernd, René Pritikin and others, Werner Klotz, solo exhibition-catalogue, Stadtgalerie, Saarbruecken, Germany and Center for the Arts, San Francisco, 1994
 Haerdter, Michael, Werner Klotz – The Boreas Project, Kuenstlerhaus,-Bethanien, Berlin, 1992

Teaching 
Werner Klotz taught Installation, Social Sculpture and Public Art at the San Francisco Art Institute from 1997 - 2002

Social Sculpture at the California College of the Arts, Oakland, CA 2002 - 2003

References

External links 
 Official Website for Werner Klotz

1956 births
Living people
German contemporary artists
German installation artists
21st-century German photographers
21st-century German male artists
American contemporary artists
American installation artists
20th-century American photographers